Yvon Douis (16 May 1935 – 28 January 2021) was a French professional footballer who played as a striker.

Career 
Douis was born in Les Andelys. During his career he played for Lille OSC (1953–59), Le Havre AC (1959–61), AS Monaco (1961–67) and AS Cannes (1967–69). He earned 20 caps and scored 4 goals for the France national football team between 1957 and 1965, and played in the 1958 FIFA World Cup, in which France finished third. Douis scored in the third place play off against West Germany at Sweden 1958.

Personal life 
Yvon was the older brother of Jean-François, who was also a footballer.

Death 
Douis died of COVID-19 during the COVID-19 pandemic in France.

References

External links
 
 

1935 births
2021 deaths
People from Les Andelys
Sportspeople from Eure
Association football forwards
French footballers
France international footballers
1958 FIFA World Cup players
1960 European Nations' Cup players
Lille OSC players
Le Havre AC players
AS Monaco FC players
AS Cannes players
Ligue 1 players
Ligue 2 players
Deaths from the COVID-19 pandemic in France
Footballers from Normandy